Appellants may refer to:

ones making an appeal in a court of law
the Lords Appellant who charged the king of England's favourites with treason (1386–1388)
those who appealed to the pope during the Archpriest Controversy (1598–1603)
those Jansenists who appealed to the pope against their condemnation (1713)